Trademark was a German music vocal band consisting of three members: Achim Remling, Mirko Bäumer and Sascha Sadeghian. The group followed the Michael Learns to Rock sound, but with more ballad tempo. Their songs and singles included "I'll Be the One", "Only Love" and "Amazed".

Trademark's song, I'll Be The One and I'm Not Supposed to Love You Anymore, was the hit song for them in several countries, especially in Asia.

After some years, the three members decided to break up the band and started their own solo careers (according to the assistant of Achim Remling - better known as Achim Petry in Germany).

Their song "Only Love" was also covered by Cantopop artist Jacky Cheung under the name "愛下去" ("May love continue"). Another song "Miss You Finally" was covered by Cantopop artist Eason Chan under the name "終於一百日" ("A hundred days finally").

Discography
Studio albums
1997: Another Time Another Place (GER: #26)

I'll Be The One
I'm Not Supposed To Love You Anymore
Miss You Finally
I'll Be There For You
There's No One Like You
How Will I Know
Is It Love
There's Another Time
My Child
Moving On (Up Down)
Standing On The Edge
Talk

2000: Only Love

Only Love
Amazed
Three's A Crowd
I Could Live On Loving You
Even When I Closed My Eyes
Don't Want To Live Without Your Love
Never Again
Right By My Side
Without You
How Could I Know
Step Into My Life

2002: Miss You Finally... The Very Best of Trademark

Miss You Finally
Only Love
Three's A Crowd
I Could Live On Loving You
I'll Be The One
Even When I Close My Eyes
Never Again
I'm Not Supposed To Love You Anymore
How Could I Know
There's No One Like You
I'll Be There For You
Without You
Amazed
Right By My Side
Is It Love
Get Up Move Your Body
Get Down Sister

EPs
1997: I'll Be the One (GER: #95)
1997: I'm Not Supposed...
2000: Amazed
2000: Only Love

References

External links
 Official website of Achim Remling, now known as Achim Petry
 Official site of Na Klar!

1995 establishments in Germany
2002 disestablishments in Germany
Musical groups established in 1995
Musical groups disestablished in 2002
German boy bands
German pop music groups
German musical trios
Vocal trios